Isabella County is a county located in the U.S. state of Michigan. As of the 2020 Census, the population was 64,394. Its county seat is Mount Pleasant. The area was known as Ojibiway Besse, meaning "the place of the Ojibwa" (known as the Chippewa in the United States).

History
Isabella County was described by action of the Michigan Territorial legislature in 1831. But for purposes of population, revenue, and judicial matters, it was assigned to nearby counties. Its area was partitioned from unorganized territory plus a portion of Mackinac, which had existed as a Territorial County since 1818.

The Michigan Territory was admitted to the Union as Michigan State in early 1837. By 1859, Isabella had sufficient settlement and interest in self-government that the State legislature authorized its organization. Based on a suggestion by Henry Rowe Schoolcraft, the US Indian Agent in this area, the county was named after Queen Isabella I of Castile, who with her husband Ferdinand commissioned Columbus's expedition in which he discovered the New World.

Isabella County comprises the Mount Pleasant, MI Micropolitan Statistical Area in Mid-Michigan, also known as Central Michigan. It is the major land base of the federally recognized Saginaw Chippewa Tribal Nation. Part of the county seat of Mount Pleasant is located within the reservation.

Geography

Highways
 – cuts across NE corner of county. Enters at Clare; runs ESE to east county line. Exits to Coleman.
 – runs north–south through the eastern central part of county. Passes Rosebush and Mt. Pleasant, runs SE to Shepherd, then runs south into Gratiot County.
 – runs east–west across lower central part of county. Enters from Remus. Ends at Mt. Pleasant.
(proposed) –  - project in Michigan is inactive

Adjacent counties

 Clare County – north
 Gladwin County – northeast
 Midland County – east
 Gratiot County – southeast
 Montcalm County – southwest
 Mecosta County – west
 Osceola County – northwest

Demographics

As of the 2000 United States Census, there were 63,351 people, 22,425 households, and 13,006 families residing in the county. The population density was 110 people per square mile (43/km2). There were 24,528 housing units at an average density of 43 per square mile (16/km2). The racial makeup of the county was 91.51% White, 2.75% Native American, 1.93% Black or African American, 1.40% Asian, 0.05% Pacific Islander, 0.68% from other races, and 1.68% from two or more races. 2.24% of the population were Hispanic or Latino of any race. 28.0% were of German, 10.1% English, 10.0% Irish, 7.5% American and 6.0% Polish ancestry, 95.9% spoke English and 1.6% Spanish as their first language.

There were 22,425 households, out of which 28.40% had children under the age of 18 living with them, 45.40% were married couples living together, 8.90% had a female householder with no husband present, and 42.00% were non-families. 23.80% of all households were made up of individuals, and 7.30% had someone living alone who was 65 years of age or older. The average household size was 2.55 and the average family size was 3.03.

The county population contained 20.30% under the age of 18, 29.40% from 18 to 24, 23.80% from 25 to 44, 17.40% from 45 to 64, and 9.00% who were 65 years of age or older. The median age was 25 years. For every 100 females there were 91.40 males. For every 100 females age 18 and over, there were 88.60 males.

The median income for a household in the county was $34,262, and the median income for a family was $45,953. Males had a median income of $32,270 versus $24,180 for females. The per capita income for the county was $16,242. 7.40% of families and 20.40% of the population were below the poverty line, including 11.30% of those under age 18 and 7.80% of those age 65 or over.

Government

The county government operates the jail, maintains rural roads, operates the major local courts, records deeds, mortgages, and vital records, administers public health regulations, and participates with the state in the provision of social services. The county board of commissioners controls the budget and has limited authority to make laws or ordinances. In Michigan, most local government functions — police and fire, building and zoning, tax assessment, street maintenance, etc. — are the responsibility of individual cities and townships.

Elected officials

 Prosecuting Attorney: David Barberi
 Sheriff: Michael Main
 County Clerk: Minde B. Lux
 Register of Deeds: Karen Jackson
 County Treasurer: Steven W. Pickens
 Drain Commissioner: Robert “Buford” Willoughby

Communities

Cities
Clare (part)
Mount Pleasant (county seat)

Villages
Lake Isabella
Rosebush
Shepherd

Charter township
Union Charter Township

Civil townships

Broomfield Township
Chippewa Township
Coe Township
Coldwater Township
Deerfield Township
Denver Township
Fremont Township
Gilmore Township
Isabella Township
Lincoln Township
Nottawa Township
Rolland Township
Sherman Township
Vernon Township
Wise Township

Census-designated places
Beal City
Loomis
Weidman
Winn

Unincorporated communities

Alembic
Blanchard
Brinton
Coe
Delwin
Leaton
Sherman City
Two Rivers
Vernon Center
Vernon City

Indian reservation
Isabella Indian Reservation

See also
 List of Michigan State Historic Sites in Isabella County, Michigan
National Register of Historic Places listings in Isabella County, Michigan

References

External links

 
Michigan counties
1859 establishments in Michigan
Populated places established in 1859